Nine Mile Creek Aqueduct is a restored stone and wood aqueduct of the Erie Canal over Nine Mile Creek in Camillus, New York, United States. It was built in 1841 and was listed on the National Register of Historic Places in 1976.

The towpath part of the structure has four arches of  each.  The structure was built of stone joined by a marine cement that was relatively new at the time, but which has endured well.

The aqueduct is within the Camillus Erie Canal Park.  Restoration work began in 2008 on the wooden bottom and sides of the aqueduct, enabling it to carry water again, and enabling reconnection of the two  segments of the Erie Canal on either side.

In August 2009, boats traversed the restored aqueduct for the first time since 1917.

It is located off Thompson Road in Camillus, about one mile east from Sim's Store. It is a few hundred yards' walking distance from a small parking area on Thompson Road.

References

External links

Camillus Erie Canal Park - Nine Mile Creek Aqueduct (Official site)
Camillus Erie Canal Park and The Nine Mile Creek Aqueduct

Erie Canal parks, trails, and historic sites
Transportation buildings and structures on the National Register of Historic Places in New York (state)
Buildings and structures in Onondaga County, New York
Erie Canal in Syracuse, New York
National Register of Historic Places in Onondaga County, New York
Aqueducts on the National Register of Historic Places